The 1986 Northwestern Wildcats team represented Northwestern University during the 1986 NCAA Division I-A football season. In their first year under head coach Francis Peay, the Wildcats compiled a 4–7 record (2–6 against Big Ten Conference opponents) and finished in eighth place in the Big Ten Conference.

The team's offensive leaders were quarterback Mike Greenfield with 1,653 passing yards, Stanley Davenport with 703 rushing yards, and Curtis Duncan with 437 receiving yards. Kicker John Duvic was selected as a first-team All-Big Ten player by the Associated Press, while tight end Rich Borresen received first-team All-Big Ten honors from the UPI.

Schedule

Personnel

No position listed: Curtis Spears

References

Northwestern
Northwestern Wildcats football seasons
Northwestern Wildcats football